is a district located in Fukuoka Prefecture, Japan.

As of 2003, the district has an estimated population of 90,560 and a density of 292.98 persons per km2. The total area is 309.13 km2.

Towns and villages
Aka
Fukuchi
Itoda
Kawara
Kawasaki
Ōtō
Soeda

Merger history
On March 6, 2006, the following towns merged to form the new town of Fukuchi:
Akaike
Kanada
Hōjō

Districts in Fukuoka Prefecture